Leonardo dell'Arca was an Italian engraver, active c. 1600. Specimens of his work are included in the permanent collection of the Victoria and Albert Museum.

References

Italian engravers
16th-century Italian painters
Italian male painters
17th-century Italian painters
Italian Baroque painters
Year of death unknown
Year of birth unknown